Katipunan Street is a national tertiary road in Cebu City, Cebu, Philippines. It commences at the corner of N. Bacalso Avenue and V. Rama Avenue in Barangay Calamba, passes through the junctions of A. Lopez and Salvador streets and ends at the junction of F. Llamas Street in Barangay Tisa.

The street is named after the Katipunan, also known as the Kataas-taasan, Kagalang-galangan, Katipunan ng mga Anak ng Bayan (KKK), a Philippine revolutionary society founded in 1892.

Route description 
The street begins as a one-way lane accessible for vehicles coming from V. Rama Avenue in Barangay Calamba and from N. Bacalso Avenue, continues towards Bible Baptist Church and passes through several commercial establishments until it reaches the junction of A. Lopez Street, a portion of which connects to Tres de Abril Street. It then becomes a two-way lane beyond the said the junction where it passes through several residential and also commercial establishments. Labangon Elementary School and Labangon Barangay Hall are among the important landmarks along the way. A few meters after reaching the junction of Salvador Street is the Labangon Town Center which marks the boundary of the said barangay with Barangay Tisa. The road then leads to Barangay Tisa's siomai and halo-halo stores until it ends at the junction of F. Llamas Street. An extension road leading to the public market and the hilly parts of the said barangay also connects the end tip of the street.

Landmarks 
 Bible Baptist Church
 Labangon Fire Station
 Labangon Elementary School
 Labangon Barangay Hall
 Labangon Town Center

Connecting streets 

 A. Lopez Street
 Camomot Francia Street
 Balaga Drive
 Gen. Java Street
 Salvador Street

 Narra Street
 Emerald Road
 F. Pacaña Street
 Cabarrubias Street

See also 
 List of streets in Cebu

References 

Streets in Cebu City